Sidney George Pothecary (26 September 1886 – 31 October 1976) was an English cricketer. Rogers was a left-handed batsman who bowled left-arm medium pace.

Pothecary made his first-class debut for Hampshire in the 1912 County Championship against Gloucestershire. Pothecary played for the club two times in the 1912 season.

In the 1913 season Pothecary played in three County Championship matches, with his final first-class appearance before the war coming against Derbyshire.

After the First World War, Pothecary returned to playing for Hampshire. Pothecary's return match came against the Australian Imperial Forces in June 1919. In addition, Pothecary played in six County Championship matches during the 1919 season.

Pothecary played his final first-class match in 1920, when Hampshire played Kent. In his twelve first-class matches for Hampshire, Pothecary scored 103 runs at an average of 10.30, with a high score of 23*. With the ball Pothecary took 4 wickets at a bowling average of 64.25, with best figures of 3/43 against the Australian Imperial Forces.

Pothecary died at Eastleigh, Hampshire on 31 October 1976.

Family
Pothecary's nephew, Arthur Pothecary represented Hampshire in 271 first-class matches.

External links
Sidney Pothecary at Cricinfo
Sidney Pothecary at CricketArchive
Matches and detailed statistics for Sidney Pothecary

1886 births
1976 deaths
Cricketers from Southampton
English cricketers
Hampshire cricketers